Anatolie Valeryevich Nikolaesh (born 17 April 1996) is a Russian football player of Moldovan descent.

Club career
He made his debut in the LigaPro for Vitória Guimarães B on 19 August 2017 in a game against Sporting Covilhã and was sent off early in the second half.

International
He won the 2013 UEFA European Under-17 Championship with Russia national under-17 football team and played with it at the 2013 FIFA U-17 World Cup.

References

External links
 

1996 births
Sportspeople from Bălți
Russian people of Moldovan descent
Moldovan emigrants to Russia
Living people
Russian footballers
Russia youth international footballers
Russian expatriate footballers
Expatriate footballers in Portugal
U.D. Leiria players
Campeonato de Portugal (league) players
Vitória S.C. B players
Liga Portugal 2 players
PFC CSKA Moscow players
Association football defenders